Shilin Night Market is a night market in Shilin District, Taipei, Taiwan, often considered to be the largest and most famous night market in Taiwan.

Overview
The night market encompasses two distinct sections sharing a symbiotic relationship: a section formerly housed in the old Shilin Market building, containing mostly food vendors and small restaurants; and the surrounding businesses and shops selling other nonfood items. The food court holds 539 stalls, and the second floor serves as a parking lot for 400 cars.

In addition to the food court, side streets and alleys are lined with storefronts and roadside stands. Cinemas, video arcades, and karaoke bars are also prevalent in the area. Like most night markets in Taiwan, the local businesses and vendors begin opening around 16:00. As students begin returning home from school, crowds reach their peak between 20:00 and 23:00. Businesses continue operating well past midnight, closing around 01:00 or 02:00.

Tourist traffic has increased since the 1997 opening of two nearby stops on the Taipei Metro system. The night market is closest to Jiantan Station on Tamsui–Xinyi line (Tamsui/Red Line), and can be seen from the station platform.

Historical development
The night market is located near the former location of a wharf on the Keelung River. Agricultural produce from farms in Shilin being shipped to other ports such as Banka and Dadaocheng would typically be sold in this area. The daytime Shilin Market was formally established in this area in 1909, and the market was inaugurated in 1913. With the influx of customers, many new businesses and food vendors began to establish themselves in the area and the Shilin Night Market was born.

Shilin Night Market has since become the largest and most well-known night market in Taiwan, especially with regards to food, and is a favorite focal point for Taipei's nightlife among residents and visitors alike.

Due to safety, sanitation and fire hazard concerns, the old Shilin Market structure was demolished in October 2002 by the Taipei City Government; the food vendors formerly based within the old structure were relocated to a newer temporary structure a few hundred meters away, next to the Jiantan Station of the Taipei metro. Plans for the renovated site began in 1999. Work commenced in 2006 after the relocation of the vendors to the temporary site. The renovated site re-opened in 2011.

Transportation
Shilin Night Market is accessible via the Tamsui–Xinyi line (Taipei Metro) at Jiantan Station. A number of bus routes also serve the area with stops at Jiantan Station, nearby Ming Chuan University, and Xiao Bei (Hsiao Pei) Street.

Famous foods
 Bubble tea
 Chicken katsu
 Cold noodles
 Fried buns
 Grilled king oyster mushrooms
 Lemon aiyu jelly
 Oyster omelet
 Oyster vermicelli
 Papaya milk
 Peanut candy
 Peanut butter and jelly sandwich
 Small Sausage in Large Sausage
 Stinky tofu
 Taiwanese tempura

See also
Night markets in Taiwan
List of night markets in Taiwan
List of restaurant districts and streets

References

External links

 Official Website

Night markets in Taipei
Entertainment districts
Restaurant districts and streets in Taiwan